Nakajō (中城, 中条, 仲条, 仲城) is a Japanese surname. It can also refer to:

People 
, a tanka poet
, Japanese sport shooter
, Japanese shōjo manga artist

Places in Japan 
Nakajō, Nagano
Nakajō, Niigata
Nakajō Station
Uonuma-Nakajō Station

Other 
 Kunito Nakajo (仲条 國士), of Shonan Junai Gumi
 Nakajo syndrome, a rare autosomal recessive congenital disorder

Japanese-language surnames